Beasts of Paradise is a 1923 American adventure silent film serial directed by William James Craft. The film stars William Desmond and Eileen Sedgwick and was produced and released by Universal Pictures. The film is presumed to be lost.

Plot
The story is told in 15 episodes which Universal advertised as: Laid aboard ship and on a mysterious island in the South Seas, the picture plot admitted of romantic and suspenseful handling. The action includes much jungle stuff and adventures on the part of the leading characters in which wild animals figure. These punch scenes include fights with lions, alligators, elephants and other jungle denizens. Especial pains were taken at Universal City, which boasts the best menagerie in the film industry, to inject real suspense and dangerous situations into the animal sequences. The sea sequences also were made with an eye to the outdoing of all previous serial thrills. Under-water fights, shark fights, submarine adventures and other aquatic thrills figure in many of the fifteen episodes of the serial.

Cast

Chapter titles

Episode 1 - The Mystery Ships
Episode 2 - Unseen Perils
Episode 3 - The Typhoon
Episode 4 - The Sea Raider
Episode 5 - The Tidewater Trap
Episode 6 - The Alligator Attacks
Episode 7 - The Deluge
Episode 8 - The Mutiny
Episode 9 - Ship Aflame
Episode 10 - The Mad Elephant Charge
Episode 11 - Smothered in the Sands
Episode 12 - Millions in Gold
Episode 13 - Into the Bloodhounds Jaws
Episode 14 - Into the Whirlpool
Episode 15 - The Trail's End

See also
 List of American films of 1923
 List of film serials
 List of film serials by studio

References

External links

1923 films
1923 lost films
1923 adventure films
American silent serial films
American black-and-white films
Universal Pictures film serials
Films directed by William James Craft
Lost American films
American adventure films
Lost adventure films
1920s American films
Silent adventure films